is a fictional character in the Street Fighter series. He made his first appearance in Super Street Fighter II in 1993 as one of the four new characters introduced in the game. In the series, he is a martial artist and action movie star. Feilong was patterned after real-life martial arts movie star Bruce Lee and much of the character's design and moves make reference to Lee. He has appeared in other Street Fighter media, including the animated films and series, comics as well as subsequent games such as Street Fighter Alpha 3 and the home versions of Street Fighter IV. The character is generally well received, with commentary focused on his similarities to Lee.

Character design
Feilong was designed as an unofficial homage to the real-life martial artist and Hong Kong movie star Bruce Lee. His name means "Flying Dragon" in Cantonese; both his default shirtless appearance with kung fu pants and his fighting style which is based on Jeet Kune Do emulate Lee's performance in Enter the Dragon. The English localization of the original arcade game pays tribute to Bruce Lee by having Feilong state "there could never be another legend like the great one and his son", a reference to Bruce Lee and his son Brandon Lee, who died shortly before the release of the game, although these references were removed in the revised localization of the Game Boy Advance version of the game. One of his alternate costumes in Street Fighter IV is based on Kato from the Green Hornet TV series. His Ultra combo in Street Fighter IV,  is a series of flurry punches into an uppercut followed by a flying kick which resembles a signature technique of Bruce Lee.

Appearances

In video games
In Super Street Fighter II, Feilong is depicted as an action film star from Hong Kong who enters the World Warrior tournament to test his skill as a martial artist. His stage bears a strong resemblance to the Tiger Balm Garden prior to its demolition.

Feilong reappears in the console versions of Street Fighter Alpha 3, where his stage was inspired by Kowloon Park. The game takes place before Feilong achieved fame as a movie star, as he makes his first hit movie in his ending in the game. He returns as a playable character in the console versions of Street Fighter IV.

As a non-playable character, Feilong appears as a spectator in Dan Hibiki's stage in Street Fighter Alpha 2 and in Felicias ending in Super Gem Fighter: Mini-Mix (Ken hooks her up with Feilong to jumpstart her movie career), in which he also has a cameo in one of the stages, in a ramen restaurant.

Other appearances
In Street Fighter II: The Animated Movie, Feilong appears as an opponent who challenges Ryu to a match while taking a break from filming his new movie. Despite putting up a good fight, Feilong loses after Ryu breaks his arm and knocks him out with a Tatsumaki Senpukyaku, but he and Ryu become friends after Feilong realises that his opponent was the one who beat Sagat. Following their fight, Ryu and Feilong take a walk, during which Feilong mentions that Sagat now works under M. Bison for Shadowlaw, which leads Ryu to first learn about the organization. In the original Japanese version he is voiced by real-life mixed martial artist Masakatsu Funaki, while in the English dub he is voiced by a then-unknown Bryan Cranston (credited as Phil Williams), who would later go on to find fame with Seinfeld and Breaking Bad.

In the anime series Street Fighter II V, Feilong is portrayed as martial artist and movie star who is a childhood acquaintance of Chun-Li, having been trained by her father, Inspector Dorai. He ends up fighting against Ken, who poses as a stunt actor during the filming of a new movie, and the two become friendly acquaintances along with Ryu. He later fights Cammy, who injured but failed to kill Dorai, in the hospital, where Cammy had been sent by Balrog to finish the job. After Cammy realises that she was fooled, she and Feilong join forces to take Balrog down. In the series, Feilong looks up to Dorai as a father figure, and tells Dorai's superior that Dorai meant more to him than his biological father.

In UDON's comic adaptation of the Street Fighter storyline, Feilong is caught up in Shadaloo's affairs after turning down a criminal movie producer's offer. Eventually, he joins Chun-Li and Gen to bring down the heads of the Hong Kong Shadaloo operation, Xiayu and Yanyu (two of M. Bison's Doll agents). They engage the pair at their Triad compound and fight off a legion of thugs and criminals before they send the duo running.

Feilong also appears briefly in the manga Cammy by Masahiko Nakahira. He challenges Cammy to a fight although he is ignored by her, and then is forced to return to a movie shooting. Nakahira depicted Feilong wearing Bruce Lee's trademark yellow tracksuit with black sidestripes from the film Game of Death.

Korean American actor Brandon Soo Hoo played Feilong in the fan film Street Fighter: Enter the Dragon.

Reception
The character has received a generally positive reception from players and game journalists. The Seattle Times described Feilong as "the deadliest" of the new characters introduced in Super Street Fighter II. In the 2002 poll by Capcom in Japan, he was voted as 38th-most popular Street Fighter character. UGO.com included him amongst the top 50 Street Fighter characters, calling him a "super serious competitor" is a mainstay in the series and a fan favorite." With regards to Super Street Fighter II, Giant Bomb editor Jeff Gerstmann noted Feilong to be in hindsight one of the "real stars" of the game alongside Cammy.

The Guardian ranked him as the 12th-top Street Fighter character in 2010. IGN ranked Feilong at number 19 in their 2008 list of top Street Fighter characters, stating "If there's any martial arts star who deserves a videogame homage, though, Bruce Lee is probably the one. Feilong helped begin a long string of characters inspired by the kung fu icon Bruce Lee". GamesRadar featured him their article "Kickass Bruce Lee clones", noting that his gameplay performance "captured the essence of Lee's iconic fighting style in his films." Gavin Jasper from Den of Geek ranked Feilong 47th on his list of Street Fighter characters, and commented that while the character is lacking in originality as a clone of Bruce Lee, he likes the fact that the character is self-aware and knows that he is a rip-off. Feilong is ranked 19th in a worldwide Street Fighter character poll held between 2017 and 2018.

See also
Bruceploitation
Marshall Law
Liu Kang
Kim Dragon
Wang
Lei Feng

References

Bruceploitation characters
Capcom protagonists
Fictional actors
Fictional Chinese people in video games
Fictional Hong Kong people
Fictional nunchakuka
Fictional Jeet Kune Do practitioners
Fictional martial artists in video games
Male characters in video games
Street Fighter characters
Video game characters based on real people
Video game characters introduced in 1993
Video game characters with fire or heat abilities